Amphids (Greek: amphi, around, double) are innervated invaginations of cuticle in nematodes. They are usually found in the anterior (head) region of the animal, at the base of the lips. Amphids are the principal olfactosensory organs of nematodes. Each amphid is made up of 12 sensory neurons  with ciliated dendrites.

References 

Nematode anatomy